Nikolay Karasyov (born 1927) is a retired Soviet rower. He competed in the coxless four at the 1956 Olympics, but failed to reach the final. He was the Soviet champion in this event in 1953, 1954 and 1956.

References

External links
 

1927 births
Possibly living people
Olympic rowers of the Soviet Union
Rowers at the 1956 Summer Olympics
Soviet male rowers